Mordechai Gebirtig, born Mordecai Bertig (4 May 1877 – 4 June 1942), was an influential Polish poet and songwriter of the interwar period. He was shot by Germans in the Kraków Ghetto, occupied Poland, during the Holocaust. A number of his Yiddish songs are sung to this day, including Es brent, Reyzele, Moyshele Mayn Fraynd, and Kinder Yorn.

Life 
Mordechai Gebirtig was born in Kraków under the Austrian Partition, and lived in its Jewish working-class quarter all his life. He served for five years in the Austro-Hungarian army. Gebirtig became a renowned folk artist in Yiddish literature and song while in Kraków.  He was self-taught in music, played the shepherd's pipe, and tapped out tunes on the piano with one finger.  He earned his livelihood as a furniture worker; while music and theatre were his avocations. His life ended in the Nazi shooting action carried out in the Kraków Ghetto on the infamous "Bloody Thursday" of June 4, 1942.

Gebirtig belonged to the Jewish Social Democratic Party, a political party in Galicia which merged into the Jewish Labour Bund after World War I. The Bund was a Yiddishist proletarian socialist party, which called for Jewish cultural autonomy in a democratic Second Republic.

Music 
From 1906 he was a member of the Jewish Amateur Troupe in Kraków. It was in such an environment that Gebirtig developed, encouraged by such professional writers and Yiddishist cultural activists as Avrom Reyzen, who for a time lived and published a journal in Krakow. Gebirtig's talent was his own, but he took the language, themes, types, tone, and timbre of his pieces from his surroundings, in some measure continuing the musical tradition of the popular Galician cabaret entertainers known as the Broder singers, who in turn were beholden to the yet older and still vital tradition of the badchen's (wedding jester's) improvisatory art.

Style of folk songs 
He published his first collection of songs in 1920, in the Second Polish Republic. It was titled Folkstimlekh ('of the folk').  His songs spread quickly even before they were published, and many people regarded them as folksongs whose author or authors were anonymous.  Adopted by leading Yiddish players such as Molly Picon, Gebirtig's songs became staples of numerous regular as well as improvised theatrical productions wherever Yiddish theatre was performed.  It is not an exaggeration to say that Gebirtig's songs were lovingly sung the world over.

S'brent 
One of Gebirtig's best-known songs is "S'brent" (It is Burning), written in 1938 in response to the 1936 Przytyk pogrom in the shtetl (small town) of Przytyk. Gebirtig had hoped its message, “Don't stand there, brothers, douse the fire!” would be a call to action. Kraków (Cracow) underground Jewish resistance adopted S'brent as its anthem in World War II. "Undzer shtetl brennt" was sung in the Nazi ghettos of German-occupied Europe. Since then the song, in the original Yiddish and in its Hebrew translation titled "Ha-Ayyarah Bo'eret" (העיירה בוערת), "Our Little Town is Burning!" - hence the occasional reference to a Yiddish title, "Undzer Shtetl Brent!", continues to be widely performed in the context of Holocaust commemoration.

Arbetsloze marsh 
One of Gebirtig's political songs that is also still popular today is the Arbetloze marsh or Song of the Unemployed:

Publications and recordings 
 . Edition Künstlertreff, Wuppertal –  (gramophone record and booklet)
 . Edition Künstlertreff, Wuppertal – 
 . Edition Künstlertreff, Wuppertal – 
 . Studio Hard, Warschau (CD)
 1946: . Krakau 1946
 1949: . Farl. Dawke, Paris 1949
 1992: . Wuppertal 1992. – 
 1997: . Lerner, Tel Aviv 1997
 2005: .' Anthony Coleman, piano. Tzadik, 2005

References

Further reading 
 Christina Pareigis: „trogt zikh a gezang ...“: jiddische Liebeslyrik aus den Jahren 1939-1945. Dölling & Galitz, München 2003. – 
 Gertrude Schneider (Hrsg.): Mordechaj Gebirtig: his poetic and musical legacy. Praeger, Westport/Connecticut 2000. –

External links
Official Mordechai Gebirtig Memorial website

Bibliography 

 http://fcit.usf.edu/Holocaust/arts/musVicti.htm
 Papers of Mordecai Gebirtig at the YIVO, New York.
 http://holocaustmusic.ort.org/places/ghettos/krakow/gebirtigmordechai/
 https://web.archive.org/web/20110519162239/http://www.jewish-theatre.com/visitor/article_display.aspx?articleID=1901
 
 http://www.klezmershack.com/bands/vanoort/fayfele/vanoort.fayfele.html ( Mariejan van Oort & Jacques Verheijen produced 'Mayn Fayfele', a musical portrait of Gebirtig, 2003.)
 http://ulrich-greve.eu/free Free scores and song lyrics in Yiddish

Bundists
1877 births
1942 deaths
Writers from Kraków
Jews from Galicia (Eastern Europe)
Yiddish-language poets
Jewish poets
People who died in the Kraków Ghetto
Polish poets
Deaths by firearm in Poland
Polish civilians killed in World War II
Austro-Hungarian military personnel of World War I
Broder singers